Gradišče pri Vojniku is a settlement in the Municipality of Vojnik in eastern Slovenia. It lies in the hills east of Vojnik. The area is part of the traditional region of Styria. It is now included with the rest of the municipality in the Savinja Statistical Region.

Name
The name of the settlement was changed from Gradišče to Gradišče pri Vojniku in 1955.

References

External links
Gradišče pri Vojniku at Geopedia

Populated places in the Municipality of Vojnik